HMS Myngs was an  which served in the Royal Navy during the First World War. The M-class ships were an improvement on those of the preceding , capable of higher speed. Myngs, the first ship to enter Royal Navy service to be named after Vice-Admiral Sir Christopher Myngs, was launched in 1914. initially serving as part of the Grand Fleet, the vessel was involved in escorting troop ships like   before being transferred to the Harwich Force in 1915. Placed within the Dover Patrol, the destroyer continued to operate as an escort, as well as taking part in sorties against German warships. Towards the end of the war, Myngs sank the monitor , which was alight following an internal explosion, with a single torpedo. After the Armistice, the destroyer was placed in reserve and subsequently sold to be broken up in 1921.

Design and development
Myngs was one of the initial six s ordered by the British Admiralty in May 1913 as part of the 1913–14 Naval Programme, one of the last destroyers to be ordered before the outbreak of the First World War. The M class was an improved version of the earlier , required to reach a higher speed in order to counter rumoured new German fast destroyers. It transpired that the German ships did not exist.

Displacement was  normal. Three funnels were fitted.

Myngs had a main armament consisting of three single QF  Mk IV guns on the  centreline, with one on the forecastle, one aft on a raised platform and one between the middle and aft funnels. Torpedo armament consisted of two twin mounts for  torpedoes located aft of the funnels. Two single 1-pounder  "pom-pom" anti-aircraft guns were carried. The anti-aircraft guns were later replaced by 2-pdr  "pom-pom" guns. The ship had a complement of 80 officers and ratings.

Construction and career
Myngs was laid down by Palmers Shipbuilding and Iron Company at their yard in Hebburn on 31 December 1913, was launched on 24 September the following year and was completed in March 1915. The destroyer cost £113,524. The vessel was the first to be named after the naval officer Vice-Admiral Sir Christopher Myngs. Myngs  was deployed as part of the Grand Fleet, joining the newly formed Tenth Destroyer Flotilla.

The destroyer took part in a wide range of activities during the war, usually alongside other members of the flotilla. By the following month, a routine developed of escorting transports departing Avonmouth and Devonport, then bringing in transports that had crossed from Canada. By October, the destroyer, along with the rest of the flotilla, had been transferred to the Harwich Force.

On arriving in Dover, the destroyer found there was less activity than expected. In fact, since 10 April 1915, the German navy had decided to no longer send warships into the Strait of Dover and the threats to shipping were substantially reduced. This gave time for other types of operations to be considered. On 25 April 1916, the flotilla engaged German battlecruisers returning from their bombardment of Yarmouth and Lowestoft, but the destroyer did not record any hits. On 14 August, the destroyer was to have supported a major minelaying expedition to take place off the Ems, but this was reduced to a much smaller operation and Myngs was no longer required. The ship remained part of the Tenth Flotilla. However, the amount of sailing increased. By the end of the year, British naval traffic in the Strait of Dover had increased dramatically and the flotilla was heavily involved in escorting convoys across to France as threats from German submarines also increased.

On 10 February 1917, Myngs was involved in an unsuccessful search for a German minelaying submarine, possibly . On 17 March, the destroyer was part of the Dover Patrol, but held in reserve against German attack. This proved useful when, on 21 April, German destroyers of the 3rd Torpedo-Boat Flotilla attacked the Kent coast. Myngs was dispatched, the last of the British destroyers deployed in the action. The ensuing battle led to the destruction of two of the German vessels and dissuaded the German fleet from attacking the Strait of Dover for many months. By this time, the Royal Navy force in Dover had grown to include 13 monitors and 43 destroyers. Myngs was part of the Sixth Destroyer Flotilla.

The destroyer again sailed against German shipping on 20 March 1918. Although still based at Dover, Myngs had been sent by Allied command in Dunkirk to patrol the east barrage in the Dover Straits in response to news of German ships being spotted there. No action took place on that occasion. After an aborted attempt on 11 April, the vessel escorted the monitors  and  that attacked Zeebrugge on 18 April. The plan included the sinking of blockships to impede the flow of German submarines leaving the port. Although the operation did not meet the expectations of the Admiralty and the port remained open, the bombardment was achieved without interference by enemy warships or the loss of any British vessel. On 11 September, the monitor  exploded while in Dover harbour. At great risk, the crew of Myngs launched a torpedo at the stricken vessel which successfully caused the ship to capsize, extinguishing the flames. Had the ship continued to burn, this could have led to many deaths.

After the Armistice of 11 November 1918 that ended the war, the Royal Navy returned to a peacetime level of strength and both the number of ships and the amount of personnel needed to be reduced to save money. Myngs was declared superfluous to operational requirements. The vessel was initially placed in reserve at the Nore but on 5 January 1920, the destroyer was passed to care and maintenance. This situation did not last long. The harsh conditions of wartime operations, particularly the combination of high speed and the poor weather that is typical of the North Sea, exacerbated by the fact that the hull was not galvanised, meant that the ship was worn out. On 9 May 1921, Myngs was sold to Thos. W. Ward to be broken up in Rainham.

Pennant numbers

References

Citations

Bibliography

 
 
 
 
 
 
 

 
 
 
 
 
 
 
 
 
 
 
 

1914 ships
Admiralty M-class destroyers
Ships built on the River Tyne
World War I destroyers of the United Kingdom